Tim Dudgeon (born 17 July 1968) is a British freestyle skier. He competed in the men's moguls event at the 1998 Winter Olympics.

References

External links
 

1968 births
Living people
British male freestyle skiers
Olympic freestyle skiers of Great Britain
Freestyle skiers at the 1998 Winter Olympics
Sportspeople from Canterbury